= 10/12 =

10/12 may refer to:

- October 12 (month-day date notation)
- December 10 (day-month date notation)
